In the mathematical discipline of graph theory, a rainbow matching in an edge-colored graph is a matching in which all the edges have distinct colors.

Definition

A maximum rainbow matching is a rainbow matching that contains the largest possible number of edges.

History

Rainbow matchings are of particular interest given their connection to transversals of Latin squares.

Denote by  the complete bipartite graph on  vertices. Every proper -edge coloring of  corresponds to a Latin square of order . A rainbow matching then corresponds to a transversal of the Latin square, meaning a selection of  positions, one in each row and each column, containing distinct entries.

This connection between transversals of Latin squares and rainbow matchings in  has inspired additional interest in the study of rainbow matchings in triangle-free graphs.

Existence when each edge has a single color
An edge-coloring is called proper if each edge has a single color, and each two edges of the same color have no vertex in common.

A proper edge-coloring does not guarantee the existence of a perfect rainbow matching. For example, consider the graph : the complete bipartite graph on 2+2 vertices. This is a proper coloring, but there are only two perfect matchings, and each of them is colored by a single color. This invokes the question: when does a large rainbow matching is guaranteed to exist?

Bounds depending only on the number of vertices 
Much of the research on this question was published using the terminology of Latin transversals in Latin squares. Translated into the rainbow matching terminology:

 In 1967, H. J. Ryser conjectured that, when  is odd, every proper edge-coloring of  has a rainbow matching of size .
 In 1975, S. K. Stein and Brualdi conjectured that, when  is even, every proper edge-coloring of  has a rainbow matching of size . (it is known that a rainbow matching of size  need not exist in this case).

A more general conjecture of Stein is that a rainbow matching of size  exists not only for a proper edge-coloring, but for any coloring in which each color appears on exactly  edges.

Some weaker versions of these conjectures have been proved:

 Every proper edge-coloring of  has a rainbow matching of size .
 Every proper edge-coloring of  has a rainbow matching  of size 
 Every proper edge-coloring of  has a rainbow matching  of size .

Bounds depending on the minimum degree 
Wang asked if there is a function  such that every properly edge-colored graph  with minimum degree  and at least  vertices must have a rainbow matching of size . Obviously at least  vertices are necessary, but how many are sufficient?

They also show that any graph with at least  vertices has a rainbow matching of size at least . These are the best known estimate to date.

Existence when the same edge may have different colors 
Suppose that each edge may have several different colors, while each two edges of the same color must still have no vertex in common. In other words, each color is a matching. How many colors are needed in order to guarantee the existence of a rainbow matching?

In complete bipartite graphs 
Drisko studied this question using the terminology of Latin rectangles. He proved that, for any , in the complete bipartite graph , any family of  matchings (=colors) of size  has a perfect rainbow matching (of size ). He applied this theorem to questions about group actions and difference sets.

Alon showed that Drisko's theorem implies an older result in additive number theory.

In general bipartite graphs 
Aharoni and Berger generalized Drisko's theorem to any bipartite graph, namely: any family of  matchings of size  in a bipartite graph has a rainbow matching of size .

Aharoni, Kotlar and Ziv showed that Drisko's extremal example is unique in any bipartite graph.

In general graphs 
In general graphs,  matchings are no longer sufficient. When  is even, one can add to Drisko's example the matching  and get a family of  matchings without any rainbow matching.

Aharoni, Berger, Chudnovsky, Howard and Seymour proved that, in a general graph,  matchings (=colors) are always sufficient.

Rainbow fractional matchings 
A fractional matching is a set of edges with a non-negative weight assigned to each edge, such that the sum of weights adjacent to each vertex is at most 1. The size of a fractional matching is the sum of weights of all edges. It is a generalization of a matching, and can be used to generalize both the colors and the rainbow matching:

 Instead of requiring that each color be a matching of size , the requirement is weakened: each "color" can be an arbitrary set of edges, but it should admit a fractional matching of size at least .
 Instead of looking for a rainbow matching, we look for a rainbow fractional matching - a fractional matching in which each edge with a positive weight has a different color.

It is known that, in a bipartite graph, the maximum fractional matching size equals the maximum matching size. Therefore, the theorem of Aharoni and Berger is equivalent to the following. Let  be any positive integer. Given any family of  fractional-matchings (=colors) of size  in a bipartite graph, there exists a rainbow-fractional-matching of size .

Aharoni, Holzman and Jiang extend this theorem to arbitrary graphs as follows.  Let  be any positive integer or half-integer. Any family of  fractional-matchings (=colors) of size at least  in an arbitrary graph has a rainbow-fractional-matching of size .  The  is the smallest possible for fractional matchings in arbitrary graphs: the extremal case is constructed using an odd-length cycle.

Partial proof 
For the case of perfect fractional matchings, both the above theorems can derived from the colorful Caratheodory theorem.

Every fractional matching corresponds to a conical combination of edges, in which each element is at most 1. A conical combination in which each element is exactly 1 corresponds to a perfect fractional matching.

Consider a graph with  vertices, and suppose there are  subsets of edges, each of which admits a perfect fractional matching (of size ). This means that the vector  is in the conical hull of each of these  subsets. By the colorful Caratheodory theorem, there exists a selection of  edges, one from each subset, that their conical hull contains . This corresponds to a rainbow perfect fractional matching. The expression  is the dimension of the vectors  - each vector has  elements.

Now, suppose that the graph is bipartite. In a bipartite graph, there is a constraint on the vectors : the sum of elements corresponding to each part of the graph must be 1. Therefore, the vectors  live in a -dimensional space. Therefore, the same argument as above holds when there are only  subsets of edges.

Rainbow matching in hypergraphs 

An r-uniform hypergraph is a set of hyperedges each of which contains exactly  vertices (so a 2-uniform hypergraph is a just a graph without self-loops). Aharoni, Holzman and Jiang extend their theorem to such hypergraphs as follows. Let  be any positive rational number. Any family of  fractional-matchings (=colors) of size at least  in an -uniform hypergraph has a rainbow-fractional-matching of size .  The  is the smallest possible when  is an integer.

An r-partite hypergraph is an -uniform hypergraph in which the vertices are partitioned into  disjoint sets and each hyperedge contains exactly one vertex of each set (so a 2-partite hypergraph is a just bipartite graph). Let  be any positive integer. Any family of  fractional-matchings (=colors) of size at least  in an -partite hypergraph has a rainbow-fractional-matching of size .  The  is the smallest possible: the extremal case is when  is a prime power, and all colors are edges of the truncated projective plane of order . So each color has  edges and a fractional matching of size , but any fractional matching of that size requires all  edges.

Partial proof 
For the case of perfect fractional matchings, both the above theorems can derived from the colorful caratheodory theorem in the previous section. For a general -uniform hypergraph (admitting a perfect matching of size ), the vectors  live in a -dimensional space. For an -uniform -partite hypergraph, the -partiteness constraints imply that the vectors  live in a -dimensional space.

Notes 
The above results hold only for rainbow fractional matchings. In contrast, the case of rainbow integral matchings in -uniform hypergraphs is much less understood.

Computation 
Garey and Johnson have shown that computing a maximum rainbow matching is NP-complete even for edge-colored bipartite graphs.

Applications 
Rainbow matchings have been applied for solving packing problems.

See also
Rainbow coloring
Rainbow-colorable hypergraph
Rainbow-independent set
Rainbow covering
Hall-type theorems for hypergraphs

References

Graph theory objects
Graph coloring
Rainbow problems